James Baxter Hunt III is a career member of the Senior Foreign Service who served as Chargé d'Affaires at the US Embassy in Santiago, Chile from January 2019 until August 10, 2020, when Richard Glenn assumed duties.  Before that, he was Deputy Chief of Mission in Santiago (since August, 2017) and Deputy Executive Secretary in the Office of the Secretary of State.

Hunt was a Presidential Management Intern working in the State Department, the Department of Defense and the National Security Council before entering the Foreign Service.

He is the son of former North Carolina governor James Baxter Hunt, Jr. and Carolyn Hunt.

Education
M.P.A., Woodrow Wilson School of Public and International Affairs, Princeton University
B.A., University of North Carolina

References

Living people
United States Foreign Service personnel
Ambassadors of the United States to Chile
Princeton School of Public and International Affairs alumni
University of North Carolina alumni
Year of birth missing (living people)
Baxter